The Free Methodist Church (FMC) is a Methodist Christian denomination within the holiness movement, based in the United States. It is evangelical in nature and is Wesleyan–Arminian in theology.

The Free Methodist Church has members in over 100 countries, with 68,356 members in the United States and 1,200,797 members worldwide. The Light & Life Magazine is their official publication. The Free Methodist Church World Ministries Center is in Indianapolis, Indiana.

History

The Free Methodist Church was organized at Pekin, New York, in 1860. The founders had been members of the Methodist Episcopal Church but were excluded from its membership for earnestly advocating what they saw as the doctrines and usages of authentic Wesleyan Methodism. Under the leadership of the Rev. Benjamin Titus (B. T.) Roberts, a graduate of Wesleyan University, the movement spread rapidly. Societies were organized, churches built, and the work established.

Before the founding of the church, Roberts began publication of a monthly journal, The Earnest Christian. In 1868, The Free Methodist (now Light & Life) was begun. A publishing house was established in 1886 to produce books, periodicals, and Sunday school curriculum and literature.

The name "Methodist" was retained for the newly organized church because the founders felt their expulsion from the Methodist Episcopal Church happened because of their adherence to doctrines and standards of Methodism. The word "Free" was suggested and adopted because the new church (1) was anti-slavery; (2) wanted pews to be free to all regardless of status, rather than sold or rented (as was common); (3) promoted freedom of worship in the Holy Spirit, as opposed to stifling formality; (4) upheld the principle of "freedom" from secret and oath-bound societies (in particular the Masonic Lodge), so as to have full loyalty to Christ; (5) stood for "freedom" from the abuse of ecclesiastical authority (due to the bishop's action in allowing expulsion of 120 clergy and lay); and (6) desired its members experience "freedom" of transformation in sanctification via the Holy Spirit due to personal consecration and faith, rather than 'sin-management' or gradual growth following justification.

At the 1910 session of the General Conference of the Methodist Church at Rochester, New York, a full acknowledgement was made of the wrong done to the late Roberts fifty years before, and the credentials taken from him were restored in a public meeting on his behalf to his son, Rev. Benson Roberts.

Holiness Conservatives within the Free Methodist Church left to form the Reformed Free Methodist Church in 1932, the United Holiness Church in 1966 (which joined the Bible Methodist Connection of Churches in 1994) and the Evangelical Wesleyan Church in 1963.

Free Methodist headquarters were located in Winona Lake, Indiana, until 1990 when the denomination moved to Indianapolis, Indiana.

Statistics
The church has about 77,000 members in the United States . Worldwide its membership is over 1,000,000  with large segments of membership in East Central Africa (Rwanda, Burundi, DRC) and India.

Beliefs and practices 
In doctrine, Free Methodists’ beliefs are the standard beliefs of Wesleyan-Arminian Protestantism, with distinctive emphasis on the teaching of entire sanctification as held by John Wesley, to whom the Free Methodist Church traces its origins.

The Free Methodist Church, along with the United Methodist Church, shares a common heritage linked to the Methodist revival in England during the 18th century. The Free Methodist Church itself arose within the context of the holiness movement within 19th century Methodism.

The first general superintendent, B. T. Roberts, was in favor of ordaining women, but never saw it take place in his lifetime. Out of his own conviction he wrote Ordaining Women: Biblical and Historical Insights. The impact of his writings eventually prevailed in the church. The Free Methodist Church affirmed the ordination of women in 1911. As of June 2008, women represented 11% of ordained clergy (216 of 2,011) and 26% of candidates for the ministry.

Free Methodists recognize and license unordained persons for particular ministries. They mandate lay representation in numbers equal to clergy in the councils of the church.

As a reaction to paid musicians in the Methodist Episcopal Church, early Free Methodists enjoyed a capella congregational hymns during worship. However, the General Conference of 1943 voted to allow each Conference to vote on whether or not their churches could have instrumental music. As a result, pianos and organs became common across most conferences. Currently, many churches have worship teams composed of vocalists, drums, keyboards, guitars, and other instruments.

The Free Methodist Way 
In response to numerous national conversations with FM leaders at all levels, in 2021, the Free Methodist bishops introduced: The Free Methodist Way: Five Values that Shape our Identity. These five values express the distinctives that set Free Methodist apart from other faith families in the body of Christ. They are as follows:

 Life Giving Holiness: GOD’S CALL TO HOLINESS was never meant to be a burden, but a gift that liberates us for life that is truly life by delivering us from the destructive power of sin.
 Love-Driven Justice: LOVE IS THE WAY WE DEMONSTRATE GOD’S HEART FOR JUSTICE by valuing the image of God in all men, women, and children, acting with compassion toward the oppressed, resisting oppression, and stewarding Creation.
 Christ-Compelled Multiplication: THE GOSPEL OF JESUS CHRIST — the message He proclaimed, the life He lived, and the ministry He modeled — set into motion a redemptive movement destined to fill the whole earth.
 Cross-Cultural Collaboration: FROM THE BEGINNING, GOD’S INTENT WAS TO HAVE A PEOPLE FROM EVERY NATION, culture and ethnicity, united in Christ and commissioned to carry out His work in the world.
 God-Given Revelation: WE HOLD UNWAVERINGLY to our conviction that the Bible is the inspired Word of God and our final authority in all matters of faith and practice.

Organization
The Free Methodist Church's highest governing body is the World Conference, which is composed of representatives, both lay and clergy, from all countries with a Free Methodist General Conference. As the church in each country develops, its status progresses from Mission District to Annual Conference to General Conference. There are currently 13 General Conferences in the world, which are linked together through the articles of religion and common constitution of the first two chapters of the Book of Discipline, the World Conference, and the Council of Bishops.
The USA branch of the Free Methodist Church is currently led by three bishops: Bishop Matthew Whitehead, Bishop Linda Adams, and Bishop Keith Cowart. All three were elected in 2019.

World Missions

Free Methodist World Missions oversees ministries across Africa, Asia, Europe, Latin America, and the Middle East. Today, 95% of Free Methodists are located outside the United States, and that number is growing daily.

International Child Care Ministries (ICCM), a child sponsorship initiative serves more than 21,000 children in 29 countries around the world. Through education, meals and medical care, children in need are given an opportunity for a better life. Each sponsored child is connected to a Free Methodist congregation or ministry at a local level.

Sustainable Empowerment through Economic Development (SEED), a micro-enterprise and livelihood ministry of Free Methodist World Missions, facilitates self-sustaining businesses, training in business skills and Christian discipleship. Focused on economically vulnerable members of the Free Methodist world family, it provides an international market for products produced by Free Methodist artisans.

Set Free Movement is seeking to mobilize faith communities, financial partners, and all segments of society towards ending human trafficking and creating new futures through community-based action.

Volunteers in Service Abroad (VISA) connects volunteers from the Free Methodist Church in the US and UK with Free Methodist World Missions for hands-on ministry internationally.

The church currently has ministry over 100 countries, including:

Higher education
B. T. Roberts began what is now Roberts Wesleyan College in 1866. Spring Arbor College followed in 1873 (renamed Spring Arbor University in 2001), Seattle Pacific University in 1891, and Greenville College (renamed Greenville University in 2017) in 1892. Central College began in 1914, a continuation of Orleans Seminary begun in 1884. Los Angeles Pacific College existed from 1903 to 1965.

The following educational institutions are a part of the Association of Free Methodist Educational Institutions. The schools are not owned by the denomination but meet a set of requirements to maintain this relationship.

 Central Christian College, McPherson, KS
 Greenville University, Greenville, IL
 Roberts Wesleyan College, Chili, NY
 Spring Arbor University, Spring Arbor, MI
 Seattle Pacific University, Seattle, WA

In addition, the Free Methodist Church is one of several denominations supporting Azusa Pacific University (Azusa, CA). Wessington Springs College is a former, now closed institution which was located in South Dakota.  Internationally, there is Osaka Christian College of the Japanese Free Methodist Church, Hope Africa University, a recently founded school in Bujumbura, Burundi, Haiti Providence University, and the Faculdade de Teologia Metodista Livre, São Paulo, Brazil.

Through the John Wesley Seminary Foundation (JWSF) graduate students who are preparing for full-time ministry in the Free Methodist Church are provided a grant or loan at the following affiliated schools:

 Asbury Theological Seminary – Wilmore, KY and Orlando, FL campuses
 Azusa Pacific University Graduate School of Theology, Azusa, CA
 George Fox Evangelical Seminary, Portland, OR
 Northeastern Seminary at Roberts Wesleyan College, Rochester, NY
 Seattle Pacific Seminary, Seattle, WA
 Wesley Biblical Seminary, Jackson, MS

Publishing
Like John Wesley before him, B. T. Roberts recognized the Christian's responsibility for publishing.

Before the founding of the church in 1860, B. T. Roberts began publication of a monthly journal, The Earnest Christian. In 1868 The Free Methodist (now Light & Life Magazine) began. A publishing house was established in 1886 to produce books, periodicals and Sunday school curriculum and literature.

Beginnings
Early leaders, T. B. Arnold and B. T. Roberts privately financed and produced several publications.

The official publishing institution was established by the church at the 1886 General Conference. The church purchased the publishing business built by Rev. T. B. Arnold for $8,000. Arnold was named first publisher and B. T. Roberts was elected editor of The Free Methodist. The Free Methodist Publishing House is recognized under its trade name Light and Life Press.

Growth and development
The Free Methodist Publishing House operated at three locations in Chicago, Illinois. In February 1935, it moved along with Free Methodist Headquarters to Winona Lake, Indiana.

During its history, the Free Methodist Publishing House built up a plant and accumulated property worth several hundred thousand dollars. It also contributed thousands of dollars out of its profits to other activities of the church.

Over the years, as the ministry of the Free Methodist Church expanded, various departments of the general church gradually moved into Free Methodist Publishing House accommodations. This was provided at vast cost and without the investment of any capital by the general church.

In 1960, the Free Methodist Publishing House board issued a deed in favor of the general church, whereby the church became the owner of the old property, plus nearly eight acres of land. For this the general church paid nothing, but agreed to make payments of $5,000 per year over a ten-year period to the Free Methodist Publishing House.

Audio Publications 
In 1944 the Free Methodist Church began a weekly radio show called The Light and Life Radio Hour which featured hymns, sermons, prayer, and scripture reading. The show ran until 1980 and featured several different hosts over the years including Dr. Leroy Lowell, Myron F. Boyd, and Robert Andrews.

In 2016 Josh Avery began The FMC Radio Show which was a spiritual successor to The Light and Life Radio Hour but embodied a very different focus. In a podcast format, the show is subtitled "your officially unofficial source for all things Free Methodist". Instead of worship and sermon, the show means to act as a uniting factor in the Free Methodist Church by informing listeners about different things that are happening in the denomination.

Ministry
Arnold’s Commentary was published from 1894–1980. In the late 1950s and early 1960s the church pioneered fully graded church school materials. In 1960 the Aldersgate Biblical Series was developed as the only inductive curriculum of its time.

A fully equipped printing area consisting of letterpresses, offset press, cutters, folders, bindery, linotypes etc. contributed toward making the church independent of commercial printers for the production for its printing needs at that time.

Acting on the recommendation of its executive committee, the board voted in 1988 to phase out printing operations. This decision and the 1989 General Conference decision to move the Press and Headquarters from Winona Lake to Indianapolis in 1990 shifted the focus of the Press. Where formerly, the Press produced and published Sunday school curriculum, this venture is now carried on in cooperation with other holiness denominations.

Beginning in 2008, the Wesleyan Publishing House, publishing arm of the Wesleyan Church, began serving the distribution and customer service needs of Light and Life Press.

Mission statement
Light & Life Communications, the official publishing arm of the Free Methodist Church, is a not-for-profit corporation that exists to serve in partnership with its parent body, the Free Methodist Church. Its primary purpose is to publish and distribute materials that enable the church to fulfill its stated mission. Light & Life Communications also offers its services and materials to all who seek to make Christ known.

Publications
Light + Life Communications is the publishing division of the Free Methodist Church.

Light + Life Magazine is the official magazine of the Free Methodist Church USA, published online. It includes in-depth journalism and interviews exploring Christian faith. Each issue is also translated into Spanish and published concurrently as Revista Luz y Vida. Jeff Finley is the magazine's executive editor.

Light + Life Bookstore is the official bookstore of Free Methodist Church USA. Free Methodist books and exclusive titles on Christian faith and Wesleyan holiness theology.

The Light + Life podcast hosts conversations that deepen people's faith through the Light+Life of Jesus Christ.

Free Methodist World Missions Heartbeat is the monthly magazine of Free Methodist World Missions.

Free Methodist Conversations is an online resource for discussing important values and issues.

References

External links

Official site
Free Methodist World Missions
International Child Care Ministries

 
History of Rochester, New York
Kosciusko County, Indiana
Religion in Indianapolis
Methodism in New York (state)
Methodism in Indiana
Religious organizations established in 1860
Methodism in the United States
Methodist denominations
Holiness denominations
1860 establishments in New York (state)
Members of the National Association of Evangelicals